Rascafría is a municipality of the Community of Madrid, Spain.

In its territory is the Monastery of  Santa Maria de El Paular.

Transport system  
The only way to arrive to Rascafría is with bus lines 194 and 194A.

References

Municipalities in the Community of Madrid